Joseph F. Vitale (born November 10, 1954) is an American Democratic Party politician, who has been serving in the New Jersey State Senate since 1998, where he represents the 19th Legislative District. He is also the former Mayor of Woodbridge Township, having been elected by the Township Council in July 2006 to fill a temporary vacancy, following the death of Mayor Frank Pelzman.  Senator Vitale came to the Senate in 1998 filling a vacancy created when Jim McGreevey stepped down from his seat as part of his ultimately unsuccessful bid for election as Governor of New Jersey in 1997. Vitale attended John F. Kennedy Memorial High School in Woodbridge Township.

Mayor of Woodbridge 
Following Pelzman's death in July 2006, Vitale volunteered to serve as Woodbridge's interim mayor.  He was nominated by the township's Democratic Committee and voted in by the Township Council to serve a four-month term as mayor, saying he was taking on the mayor's job in order to continue Pelzman's programs and to provide leadership during the interim period, though the time constraints of dual office holding were making him rule out seeking the remaining 14 months of Pelzman's term during the November 2006 special election for mayor. Vitale endorsed former State Treasurer John McCormac in the special election and served as mayor until November 13, 2006, when McCormac was sworn in.

New Jersey Senate 
Vitale was elected in the 1997 elections to succeed Jim McGreevey who was running for Governor. As the 19th districts consists of mainly Democrat-friendly towns in Middlesex County, he has been easily reelected in every Senate election never winning by less than 20 points. From 2004 to 2009, Vitale was the Deputy Majority Leader in the Senate. Currently, he is Chairman of the Senate on the Health, Human Services and Senior Citizens Committee and the Vice Chairman in the Senate for Economic Growth. Vitale and William Gormley were the lead sponsors of the 1999 New Jersey Homeless Youth Act, which allows minors to seek homeless shelter without parental approval. He is also the sponsor of bills to allow needle exchange programs for drug users and to prohibit gun ownership by those convicted of domestic violence offenses. Senator Vitale was the prime sponsor of over forty bills that were signed into law, including bills establishing the KidCare and FamilyCare health care coverage programs, as well as a bill which would require nursing aides to undergo certified criminal background checks, a bill which would prohibit the use of mandatory overtime in health care facilities except in emergency situations, and the New Jersey Health Care Access and Patient Protection Act, which requires the State to compile information on doctors, such as office location and medical malpractice history, in a database available to the public. As chairman of the Health and Human Services Committee, Vitale has blocked a vote in the Senate on a measure that has passed twice in the General Assembly under which non-professional bakers would be allowed to legally sell their goods to consumers, leaving New Jersey and Wisconsin as the only states that forbid the practice. Vitale has cited "public safety and public health concerns", along with the impact of home-based competition on local brick-and-mortar businesses, as his reasons for blocking the measure.

Committees 
Health, Human Services and Senior Citizens
Transportation, Vice-Chair

District 19 
Each of the 40 districts in the New Jersey Legislature has one representative in the New Jersey Senate and two members in the New Jersey General Assembly. The representatives from the 19th District for the 2022—23 Legislative Session are:
Senator Joseph Vitale (D), 
Assemblyman Craig Coughlin (D), and 
Assemblywoman Yvonne Lopez (D)

Electoral history

New Jersey Senate

References

External links
Senator Vitale's Website
Senator Vitale's legislative webpage, New Jersey Legislature
New Jersey Legislature financial disclosure forms - 20161 2015 2014 2013 2012 2011 2010 2009 2008 2007 2006 2005 2004

Living people
1954 births
American people of Italian descent
Democratic Party New Jersey state senators
Mayors of Woodbridge Township, New Jersey
20th-century American politicians
21st-century American politicians